William Ingleby Jefferson (born 25 October 1979) is a former professional cricketer who played for Essex County Cricket Club, Nottinghamshire and Leicestershire in a 12-year career. He retired from the game in 2012 as a result of a chronic hip complaint.

Jefferson was a right-handed opening batsman and a reliable slip fielder. He was born in Derby to a cricketing family; his father Richard Jefferson played first-class cricket for Surrey, while his grandfather Julian Jefferson played first-class cricket in the 1920s for services teams. He showed his promise at Oundle School and Durham University. Jefferson studied at Durham from 1999 to 2002, completing the Sport in the Community course. He made his first-class debut for British Universities against the touring Zimbabweans in 2000.

His first full season at Essex was 2002, during which he scored 815 first-class runs; his 165 not out in the final match of the season
made a major contribution to Essex winning the second division of the County Championship.

His best season was 2004, in which he scored 1555 first-class runs at an average of 55.53 with 6 centuries including a high score of 222. In 2005, a slump in form saw him relegated to the Essex Second XI, but he responded with 303 not out against Marylebone Cricket Club (MCC) Young Cricketers, and regained his place in the first team.

Before the start of the 2006 season, he suffered a freak accident, cutting his left wrist whilst trying to open a window, and severing the tendons. After recovering from this injury, he failed to regain a regular place in the Essex side, and left the county by mutual consent in August 2006. In September of that year, he signed a three-year contract with Nottinghamshire.

In January 2007, he was selected for the England A team to tour Bangladesh in February and March.

Jefferson had his contract terminated by Nottinghamshire in September 2009 after a run of poor form stretching back two years. However, he marked a return to form by scoring 112 in the first match of the 2011 county season, and his finest moment for Leicestershire was probably to secure their place in the T20 Final that year by smashing three boundaries in the "super over" needed, after their semi-final against Lancashire ended in a tie.

Notes

References

William Jefferson from CricketArchive
Will Jefferson from the ECB

English cricketers
Essex cricketers
Nottinghamshire cricketers
People educated at Oundle School
1979 births
Living people
Leicestershire cricketers
Durham MCCU cricketers
Cricketers from Derby
British Universities cricketers
Alumni of the College of St Hild and St Bede, Durham